Trillium Power Wind 1 (TPW1) was a proposed 450 to 500 megawatt (MW) far-offshore wind farm in the Canadian waters of northeastern Lake Ontario at least  from the nearest mainland. This renewable energy project was being developed by Trillium Power Wind Corporation, a privately, Canadian-owned company headquartered in Toronto, Ontario. The project was cancelled by the Ontario government on February 11, 2011. Had it not been cancelled TPW1 would have been among the first offshore wind farms built in the Great Lakes. Trillium's subsequent lawsuit was struck down almost in its entirety by the Ontario Court of Appeal which ruled that it could proceed with a claim for misfeasance in public office.

Project description
Following the cancellation of the project, on May 19, 2011, Trillium Power Wind Corporation  gave notice to the McGuinty Government that if its action against Trillium Power was not corrected it would initiate an action suing the Government of Ontario for CDN$2.25 billion. No correction was made as requested. Therefore, on September 28, 2011, Trillium Power Wind Corporation filed its claim in the Ontario Superior Court of Justice and was assigned the court file  CV-11-436012. While the legal claim was initiated against the government of Dalton McGuinty, Trillium Power has continuously stated in the media that it does not hold Premier Wynne responsible for creating the cause of the litigation. Instead, Trillium Power has stated that litigation was the last option and was only taken when the McGuinty government would not even meet or discuss options to correct their targeted action to harm Trillium Power.

The TPW1 far-offshore wind site is acknowledged as the premier site in North America and especially The Great Lakes. The project was to consist of approximately 90 to 100 either 5.0 MW or 6.0 far-offshore turbines and two offshore substations linked to the Lennox Transmission Station by way of an underwater cable. The total project cost was estimated at $1.5 billion of private capital with no cost to taxpayers for the proposed construction.

The wind farm was to produce between 450 and 500 megawatts (MW) of electricity with a net capacity factor of 43%, which is equivalent to the amount of power consumed by a minimum of 130,000 typical Ontario households. TPW1 would have offset at least 1.5 million tonnes of  emissions from coal-fired generation and 931,745 tonnes of  emissions from natural gas generation every year. All power generated by the project was to be sold to the Ontario Power Authority under a 20-year minimum Power Purchase Agreement. Under Ontario's Green Energy and Green Economy Act adopted in May 2009, offshore wind facilities of any size will receive a 19¢ per kilowatt hour (kWh) Feed-in tariff.

Key attributes
 Mean wind speed of 9.0 m/s at 100 m hub height based on data collected by both LIDAR and Meteorological Mast wind-measuring devices, along with 36 years of data collected on Main Duck Island;
 Water depth ranging from 2 to 40 m (6 to 130 ft);
 Power density of 938 W/m3;
 Close proximity to major grid interconnection points (28 km);
 Average wave height of less than 1 m (3.2 feet) 94% of the time from April to November;
 Low/zero visibility from mainland shore or nearby major islands.

Approvals process and current status
Trillium Power followed Ontario's Renewable Energy Approval process. As of  February 11, 2011, when the project was cancelled, Trillium Power had completed 105 studies, reports and regulatory actions including, but not limited to: avian, aquatic, geophysical, ice, wave, navigation, noise, etc. The first round of public consultations were held in Napanee, Ontario, Picton, Ontario and Cape Vincent, New York in early July 2010.

The TPW1 site was to be located on provincial Crown Land secured through Ontario's Windpower Site Release and Development Program via an embedded Land Use Permit (LUP).

All offshore wind power projects were cancelled/suspended by the Ontario government, in February 2011 prior to Trillium Power's imminent closing of a $26 million tranche of equity financing on February 11, 2011 at 3:00 pm.

The claim by Trillium Power vs. Ontario was initially struck down by a motions judge and was then appealed to Ontario's highest court, the Ontario Court of Appeal. The Appeal was heard on March 22, 2013. On November 12, 2013, the three judges of the Ontario Court of Appeal rendered their decision whereby they found Trillium Power's case could proceed on the claim of misfeasance in public office. On February 28, 2014, the Ontario Government filed a Statement of Defense.

Additional projects 

TPW1 was to be the first of Trillium Power's four unique offshore wind developments in the Great Lakes. Trillium Power's additional sites include: Trillium Power Wind 2, The Great Lakes Array and The Superior Array.

See also

Wind power in Canada
List of Offshore Wind Farms
Feed-in tariff
Green Energy Act 2009

References

External links
Corporate website
The Great Lakes May Soon be Home to Offshore Wind
America's Offshore Wind Race is On: Can the US Compete with Canada?
Who Will Build the First Offshore Wind Farm in North America?

Offshore wind farms
Proposed wind farms in Canada